The 1983 Liège–Bastogne–Liège was the 69th edition of the Liège–Bastogne–Liège cycle race and was held on 17 April 1983. The race started and finished in Liège. The race was won by Steven Rooks of the Sem–France Loire team.

General classification

References

1983
1983 in Belgian sport
1983 Super Prestige Pernod